Phillip B. Journey (born April 2, 1956) is an American politician and judge.

Journey was born in Kansas City, Kansas, on April 2, 1956. He studied business at Washburn University, then attended the Oklahoma City University School of Law.

Following Nancey Harrington's resignation from the Kansas Senate in 2003, Journey was appointed to complete her term, starting in 2004. A Republican, Journey represented the 26th district until 2008. He was then appointed to Kansas's 18th Judicial District Court for Division 1. He ran unopposed for reelection twice until defeating Joni Cole in 2020.

Journey is a member of the board for the National Rifle Association.

References

1956 births
Living people
21st-century American judges
21st-century American politicians
Kansas state court judges
Republican Party Kansas state senators
People from Sedgwick County, Kansas
Oklahoma City University School of Law alumni
Washburn University alumni